Yabetsu Dam  is a gravity dam located in Hokkaido Prefecture in Japan. The dam is used for flood control. The catchment area of the dam is 32.5 km2. The dam impounds about 42  ha of land when full and can store 3800 thousand cubic meters of water. The construction of the dam was started on 1969 and completed in 1975.

References

Dams in Hokkaido